Ma Aixin (born 1974) is a Chinese translator of literary works, especially children's literature, from English.

Biography
Ma was born in Nanjing, Jiangsu, in 1974. Her grandfather Ma Qinghuai was also a translator. Her sister Ma Ainong is also a translator of children's literature. Her parent are editors. After graduating from Beijing Foreign Studies University, he worked at Foreign Translation Publishing Company. Ma's translation career commenced when, in collaboration with her sister Ma Ainong, she began to translate Joanne Kathleen Rowling's Harry Potter series, into English and had it published in China in October 2000.

Translations
 Harry Potter series
 Seventeen
 Penrod
 The Lost Prince
 The Phoenix and the Carpet

References

1974 births
Living people
Writers from Nanjing
Beijing Foreign Studies University alumni
English–Chinese translators
People's Republic of China translators